The Leader of the Opposition in the Chhattisgarh Legislative Assembly is the politician who leads the official opposition in  the Chhattisgarh Legislative Assembly.

Eligibility 
Official Opposition is a term used to designate the political party which has secured the second largest number of seats in the assembly. In order to get formal recognition, the party must have at least 10% of total membership of the Legislative Assembly. A single party has to meet the 10% seat criterion, not an alliance. Many of the Indian state legislatures also follows this 10% rule while the rest of them prefer single largest opposition party according to the rules of their respective houses.

List of Leaders of the Opposition

See also 

 Government of Odisha
 Governor of Odisha
 Chief Minister of Odisha
 Odisha Legislative Assembly
 List of current Indian opposition leaders

References 

Odisha Legislative Assembly